Edmond Crawford (31 October 1906 – 13 December 1977) was an English footballer and football manager.

Playing career
Crawford started his career as an amateur when joining his two brothers at Filey Town in February 1922. He moved to Scarborough Penguins in 1923, then to Scarborough before returning to Filey Town for two seasons in 1929, where he set a local league record by scoring 141 goals in 73 matches. He then signed for Liverpool where he scored 4 goals in 8 matches. In 1933, he joined Clapton Orient, where he ended his playing career. He played his last 6 years with an undiagnosed broken ankle.

Coaching career
After the World War II, he started his coaching career in Sweden with Degerfors IF. He then went to Italy, at Bologna, as George Raynor told him there was a job. He then went to Livorno, AEK Athens and Barnet, and also later assisted at Crewe Alexandra.

References

1906 births
People from Filey
English footballers
Association football forwards
Halifax Town A.F.C. players
Liverpool F.C. players
Leyton Orient F.C. players
Watford F.C. wartime guest players
English football managers
Bologna F.C. 1909 managers
U.S. Livorno 1915 managers
AEK Athens F.C. managers
Barnet F.C. managers
1977 deaths
Footballers from North Yorkshire
Scarborough F.C. players